The lieu unique is a center for contemporary culture located in Nantes, France. Opened at the beginning of the 21st century, it is housed in a former biscuit factory at the center of the city. It was founded by Jean Blaise, directed by Patrick Gyger from 2011 to 2020, and is currently directed by Eli Commins.

Presentation 
Scène nationale of Nantes (center for contemporary culture), the lieu unique is a space for artistic exploration, cultural effervescence and conviviality that is internationally recognized for its spirit of curiosity in the different domains of art: visual art, theatre, dance, circus, music, but also literature, philosophy, architecture, and digital culture.

Every year the lieu unique presents dozens of shows (theater, dance, circus and music as well as concerts, literary gatherings, philosophical debates, exhibitions, residencies for artists, festivals).

History

From 1895 to 1985 - A biscuit factory 
In 1895, the Nantes-based biscuit makers Lefèvre-Utile (LU), famous for their petit beurre cookies, built a factory on quai Ferdinand-Favre to develop new products. The structure, made entirely of concrete and metal, was innovative for its time and the two magnificent junction towers, which were added in 1909, make it one of Nantes’ most iconic buildings.

From 1986 to 1999 - The factory re-adapted in a cultural place 
In 1986, and decades of expansion later, LU moved its production out of the city centre. Its old factories were mostly demolished and only the annex of the quai Ferdinand-Favre now remains standing.

From 1989, artists (in particular, the Royal de Luxe theatre troupe) began taking over the abandoned structure and turning it into a place of atypical creativity.

In 1994, in this abandoned building, the Centre de Recherche et de Développement Culturel (CRDC) a cultural association in Nantes, began to hold cultural events: Les Allumées (1990/91/92/93/94), Trafics (1996/97) and Fin de siècle (1997/98/99).

Jean Blaise, Director of the CRDC at the time, convinced the city of Nantes to preserve the building and transform it into a new type of living cultural space, that could also be a meeting place outside of exhibitions and performances. He submitted a cultural project plan to Jean-Marc Ayrault, mayor of Nantes: to create a place where life would spontaneously exist side by side with art, in its more contemporary or even disturbing ways. The project also included spaces of services (bar, restaurant, bookstore, day nursery, hammam).

In 1998, restoration work on the only remaining tower began, conducted by Jean-Marie Lépinay, as well as rehabilitation of the factory by the French architect Patrick Bouchain, one of his first big projects.

The opening in 2000 
The lieu unique opened on the 30th of December 1999, during the "End of century" festival in Nantes. This opening was marked by the Grenier du siècle (The Store of the century).
A translucent double wall was designed to receive an important collection of objects given by the population. Put in cans, these objects are going to stay a whole century in this Store, until its opening on 1 January 2100 at 5pm.

Today, the Lieu unique is internationally recognized for its spirit of curiosity in the various fields of art: plastic arts, theater, dance, circus, music, but also literature, philosophy, architecture and digital cultures. Each year, the contemporary culture center offers more than 100 shows  as well as several exhibitions and residencies for visual artists. Highlights (festivals, major debates, etc.) and a section of conferences and debates called "labo utile" (society, architecture, documentary cinema, philosophy, etc.)

Images of the lieu unique

From Outside

On the ground floor

On the First Floor

References

External links 

 

Nantes
Buildings and structures in Nantes
Tourist attractions in Nantes
Arts centres in France
Squash venues